Twelve ships of the Royal Navy have been named HMS Repulse:
  was a 50-gun galleon also known as Due Repulse, launched in 1595 and in the records until 1645.
  was a 10-gun cutter purchased in 1779 and in the records until 1781.
  was a 64-gun third rate launched in 1780 and wrecked in 1800.
  was a 12-gun cutter purchased in 1780 and wrecked in 1782.
  was a 4-gun vessel purchased in 1794 and broken up a year later.
  was a 74-gun third rate launched in 1803 and broken up in 1820.
 HMS Repulse was a screw-propelled 91-gun second rate launched on 27 February 1855 as HMS Repulse but renamed HMS Victor Emmanuel on 7 December 1855, used as a receiving ship after 1873, and sold in 1899.
  was an ironclad ship launched in 1868 and sold in 1889.
  was a  launched in 1892 and sold in 1911.
  was a  launched in 1916 and sunk in a Japanese air attack in 1941.
  was a  launched in 1967 and laid up in 1997.

Battle honours
 Cadiz, 1596
 Martinique, 1762
 The Saints, 1782
 Atlantic, 1939–40
 Norway, 1940
 Bismarck, 1941

Royal Navy ship names